The New Republic is a political party in Romania. It was established in October 2011 as a grassroots movement inspired by a manifesto on blogs and center-right platforms. The movement grew and spawned more than 40 branches around the country. The first President was Mihail Neamțu, an intellectual who entered politics. The Vice President is George Mioc. On 16 March 2015, Neamțu announced he was stepping down to focus more on his family.

George Mioc also left the party in 2015. On 19 September 2015 the party had the fourth Congress in Bucharest and voted a new statute and a new president.

History

In July 2012, the party's first National Convention elected Mihail Neamțu as party president. Soon after its founding, the party joined  Right Romania Alliance (ARD), together with the former governing party, Democratic Liberal Party (PDL); Civic Force, the party of former Prime Minister Mihai Răzvan Ungureanu; and the Christian Democratic National Peasants' Party (PNTCD). The party filled 9 candidates on the ARD list at 2012 legislative election, but because of administrative problems, New Republic's candidates ran as independents or under PNTCD's logo instead.  The party's Vice-President at that time, Valeriu Todiraşcu, was elected to the Senate. In November, 2013 the party became member of the Alliance of Conservatives and Reformists in Europe (AECR) until 2018.

Electoral history

Legislative elections

References

External links

Liberal parties in Romania
Political parties established in 2012
Alliance of Conservatives and Reformists in Europe member parties
2012 establishments in Romania
Conservative parties in Romania
Registered political parties in Romania
Classical liberal parties